Hasdeo Bango Dam is a dam constructed in 1961-62 across the Hasdeo river in Chhattisgarh, India. It is the longest, widest dam in Chhattisgarh and the first multi-purpose water project in Chhattisgarh. It is located 70 km from Korba, Korba district. It has a catchment area of 6,730 km2. The dam has a large effective storage capacity of 2.89 cubic kms (102.07 tmc ft). 
It has the capacity to generate 120MW electricity. Hasdeo Bango Dam is constructed across Hasedo river.

See also 
 Tourism in Chhattisgarh
 Satrenga, Chhattisgarh

References 

Dams in Chhattisgarh
Korba, Chhattisgarh
Dams completed in 1962
1962 establishments in Madhya Pradesh
20th-century architecture in India